Clarke Abel (5 September 1780 – 24 November 1826) was a British surgeon and naturalist. 

He accompanied Lord Amherst on his mission to China in 1816-17 as the embassy's chief medical officer and naturalist, on the recommendation of Sir Joseph Banks. The mission was Britain's second unsuccessful attempt to establish diplomatic relations with China and involved travelling to the  Beijing and the famous botanical gardens of Fa Tee (Huadi) near Canton (Fangcun District). 
While in China, Abel collected specimens and seeds of the plant that carries his name, Abelia chinensis, described by Banks' botanical secretary Robert Brown, "with friendly partiality". However a shipwreck and an attack by pirates on the way back to his home in Britain caused him to lose all of his specimens. Abel's Narrative of a Journey in the Interior of China, 1818, gives a detailed account of the collection's misfortunes. However, he had left some specimens with Sir George Staunton at Canton, who was kind enough to return them to him; living specimens of the Chinese Abelia that we know today were introduced by Robert Fortune in 1844.

In March 1819 he was elected a Fellow of the Royal Society. He was also a member of the Geological Society.

Abel was the first Western scientist to report the presence of the orangutan on the island of Sumatra; the Sumatran Orangutan Pongo abelii Lesson 1827 is named for him.  He went on to become the surgeon-in-chief to Lord Amherst when the earl was appointed Governor-general of India. Abel died at Cawnpore, India, 24  November 1826, aged 46.

Abel was also the first scientist to describe the Chiru or Tibetan Antelope, in 1826.  It is the only member of the genus Pantholops.

In 1919, botanist Takenoshin Nakai published Abeliophyllum, which is a genus of shrubs from Korea, in the olive family, Oleaceae. It was named in Clarke Abel's honour. Then in 2010, Landrein published Diabelia, which is a genus of shrubs from China and Korea, in the Caprifoliaceae family.

References

 Diana Wells, 100 Flowers and How They Got their Names, (Chapel Hill: Algonquin), 1997.
 Alice M. Coats, "The Plant Hunters", (London: Studio Vista Limited), 1969. 

1780 births
1826 deaths
British surgeons
British naturalists
Fellows of the Royal Society
Fellows of the Linnean Society of London
Fellows of the Geological Society of London
People educated at Merchant Taylors' School, Northwood